Planostocha is a genus of moths belonging to the subfamily Tortricinae of the family Tortricidae.

Species
Planostocha clavigera (Diakonoff, 1953)
Planostocha cumulata (Meyrick, 1907)
Planostocha curvosa (Diakonoff, 1941)
Planostocha undulans (Diakonoff, 1944)

See also
List of Tortricidae genera

References

 , 1912, Exotic Microlepid. 1: 13.
 , 2005, World Catalogue of Insects 5.

External links
tortricidae.com

Archipini
Tortricidae genera